The 1985 college football season may refer to:

 1985 NCAA Division I-A football season
 1985 NCAA Division I-AA football season
 1985 NCAA Division II football season
 1985 NCAA Division III football season
 1985 NAIA Division I football season
 1985 NAIA Division II football season